Central Fife was a parliamentary constituency represented in the House of Commons of the Parliament of the United Kingdom from February 1974 until 2005, when it was largely replaced by the new Glenrothes constituency, with a small portion joining the expanded North East Fife.

It elected one Member of Parliament (MP), using the first-past-the-post voting system.

Boundaries

1974–1983
The burghs of Cowdenbeath, Leslie, Lochgelly, and Markinch, the districts of Glenrothes and Lochgelly, and the electoral divisions of Markinch North and Markinch South in the district of Kirkcaldy.

1983–1997
The Kirkcaldy District electoral divisions of: 
 
 Denbeath/Aberhill
 Mountfleurie/Methilhill/Methil North
 Leven
 Kennoway/Windygates
 Leslie/Markinch Star
 Auchmuty/Woodside
 Pitteuchar/Stenton/Balgonie
 South Parks/Rimbleton
 Southwood/Caskieberran

1997–2005
The Kirkcaldy District electoral divisions of: 
 
 Methil, Denbeath and Muiredge
 Methilhill and Mountfleurie
 Leven
 Kennoway and Windygates
 Markinch, Pitcoudie and Star
 Auchmuty, Woodside and Coaltown of Balgonie
 Pitleuchar and Stenton
 Rimbleton and South Parks
 Glenwood and Newcastle
 Leslie and Collydean

Members of Parliament

Elections

Elections of the 1970s

Elections of the 1980s

Elections of the 1990s

Elections of the 2000s

References 

Historic parliamentary constituencies in Scotland (Westminster)
Constituencies of the Parliament of the United Kingdom established in 1974
Constituencies of the Parliament of the United Kingdom disestablished in 2005
Politics of Fife